Oh Sa-ra (born 26 November 1992) is a South Korean handball player for Busan and the South Korean national team.

She participated at the 2021 World Women's Handball Championship in Spain.

References

1992 births
Living people
South Korean female handball players